The Light in You is the eighth studio album by American rock band Mercury Rev, released on September 18, 2015 by Bella Union. The Light in You is the band's first entirely self-produced and recorded album, as well as the first not to be produced by longtime collaborator Dave Fridmann.

Critical reception

Upon its release, The Light in You received generally positive reviews from music critics. At Metacritic, which assigns a normalized rating out of 100 to reviews from mainstream critics, the album has received an average score of 75 based on 14 reviews.

Track listing

Personnel
Mercury Rev
Jonathan Donahue — lead vocals, acoustic and electric guitars, transistor organ, bells, chimes, orchestral arrangements
Grasshopper — Cabronita electric guitar, harmony vocals, electric sitar, National steel mandolin, clarinet, Moon-glo organ, vibraphone, Perico percussion, Gretsch kit drums; lead vocals (track 10)
Additional personnel
Jennifer Donovan – violin
Jesse Chandler — pianos, harmony vocals, flutes, woodwinds
Anthony Molina — bass, harmony vocals, piano
Scott Petito — Hofner bass, electric sitar, electric guitar
Jason Miranda — drums
Hari Prakaash — gong
Ken Stringfellow — vocals
Aden Stringfellow — vocals
Vanessa Gray — vocals (tracks 1, 5, 11)
Alise Marie — vocals (tracks 3, 4, 6)
Rebecca Bortman — vocals (track 8)
Nicole Atkins — vocals (tracks 10, 11)

Charts

References

2015 albums
Albums produced by Dave Fridmann
Mercury Rev albums